The 2022 League of Ireland First Division season was the 38th season of the League of Ireland First Division, the second tier of the Republic of Ireland's association football league. The title was won by Cork City.

Overview
The First Division has 9 teams. Each side plays each other four times for a total of 32 matches in the season. The team that finishes in first place achieve automatic promotion to the Premier Division. Teams finishing second to fifth place will enter the play-offs to determine the side to contest for a place in the 2023 Premier Division against the ninth placed (second last) Premier Division team.

Teams

Team changes
Bray Wanderers and Cabinteely F.C. merged in the pre-season to create a revamped Bray Wanderers. Shelbourne were promoted as 2021 champions and UCD as playoff winners, to the Premier Division. Waterford F.C. and Longford Town F.C. joined following their relegation from the Premier League at the end of the 2021 season.

Additional teams
No other teams applied for a First Division Licence.

Stadia and locations

Managerial changes

Personnel and kits

Note: Flags indicate national team as has been defined under FIFA eligibility rules. Players may hold more than one non-FIFA nationality.

League table

Play-offs

Bracket

First Division play-off Semi-finals

First leg

Second leg

First Division play-off Final

Promotion/relegation play-off

See also
 2022 League of Ireland Premier Division
 2022 FAI Cup

References

League of Ireland First Division seasons
2022 League of Ireland
2
Ireland
Ireland